There are several rivers named Ipiranga River in Brazil:

 Ipiranga River (Paraná)
 Ipiranga River (São Paulo)
 Ipiranga Brook (São Paulo)
 Ipiranga River (Pará)

See also 
 Ipiranga (disambiguation)